Ironcast is a turn-based strategy video game with individual missions played through a match-three system.  The game features procedurally generated missions and permadeath, staples of the roguelike genre.  The game was developed by Dreadbit and released for PC platforms in March 2015, PS4 and Xbox One in March 2016, and Nintendo Switch version in August 2017.

Gameplay 
The game is set in a steampunk 19th century, the player commands mecha robots (the eponymous Ironcasts) and must deploy them to repel a French invasion of Britain.  Players can choose from an assortment of missions, their successful completion will reward the player with repairs and upgrades to their Ironcast.  The missions are conducted through a match-three system, with coloured tiles on the grid representing resources required for the Ironcast's operation.

Production 
Ironcast was developed by Dreadbit, a studio founded by Daniel Leaver, formerly a senior designer at Media Molecule.  The game was part funded through a Kickstarter crowdfunding campaign, raising £10,183 in October 2014.

Reception 
The game received a positive critical reception, with Metacritic scores of 70/100, 75/100 and 78/100 for the PlayStation 4, PC and Xbox One platforms respectively.  Christian Donlan, reviewing the game at Eurogamer described it as "tense and personable and clever".  John Walker at Rock, Paper, Shotgun found it "much more tactically thoughtful than a match-3 RPG has been before", though found the game's presentation dull.

References

External links
Ironcast official site 

2015 video games
Alternate history video games
Crowdfunded video games
Kickstarter-funded video games
Linux games
Video games about mecha
MacOS games
Nintendo Switch games
PlayStation 4 games
Roguelike video games
Steampunk video games
Turn-based strategy video games
Video games developed in the United Kingdom
Video games set in the 19th century
Windows games
Xbox One games